UDP-2-acetamido-3-amino-2,3-dideoxy-glucuronate N-acetyltransferase (WbpD, WlbB) is an enzyme with systematic name acetyl-CoA:UDP-2-acetamido-3-amino-2,3-dideoxy-alpha-D-glucuronate N-acetyltransferase. This enzyme catalyses the following chemical reaction

 acetyl-CoA + UDP-2-acetamido-3-amino-2,3-dideoxy-alpha-D-glucuronate  CoA + UDP-2,3-diacetamido-2,3-dideoxy-alpha-D-glucuronate

This enzyme participates in the biosynthetic pathway for UDP-alpha-D-ManNAc3NAcA (UDP-2,3-diacetamido-2,3-dideoxy-alpha-D-mannuronic acid).

References

External links 
 

EC 2.3.1